Kyawswa is a common Burmese name. It was formerly a royal title during the days of Burmese monarchy. The name may mean:
 Kyawswa of Pagan: King of Pagan (1289–1297)
 Kyawswa I of Pinya: King of Pinya (1344–1350)
 Kyawswa II of Pinya: King of Pinya (1350–1359)

It is not to be confused with the name Kyaswa, also the title of kings.
 Kyaswa: King of Pagan (1235–1251)
 Kyaswa of Sagaing: King of Sagaing Kingdom (1339–1349)

Burmese royal titles